Mikko Minkkinen (born 23 May 1984 in Vantaa) is a Finnish former competitive figure skater. He is the 2008 Finnish national champion and the 2002 Junior national champion. He is the 2002 Nordic junior silver medalist and 2008 senior silver medalist.

Programs

Results

References

External links

Navigation

Finnish male single skaters
1984 births
Living people
Sportspeople from Vantaa